Kevin Seconds (born Kevin Marvelli; March 24, 1961) is an American singer/songwriter/musician, born in Sacramento, California. As a teenager, he moved with his family to Reno, Nevada where he lived until 1988 when he relocated back to Sacramento and has been based ever since.

It was while living in Reno, that he founded the highly influential hardcore punk band 7 Seconds in 1979 with his younger brother Steve Youth. Having been their frontman from the start, he also writes their lyrics. The band signed to the Better Youth Organization label in late 1983. BYO put out 7 Seconds' first album, The Crew. Since its formation, 7 Seconds has released over fifteen records as well as touring North America, Europe, and Japan multiple times.

Simultaneously with his career with 7 Seconds, he has been engaged in several side band projects. These include Go National, Drop Acid, Mustard, 5'10", Ghetto Moments, Kevin Seconds & The Altruistics, Positively Ventilate, Unsteady Heights and his newest musical project, Gimme An F.

Besides his musical endeavors, Seconds is an artist and illustrator and makes his artwork available at his live shows and via his website. He also sporadically hosts an online radio show called Sound Salvation Radio as well as his own podcast The Ramble Transmissions which he oftens broadcasts live from his van while on tour. On his podcast, Seconds discusses music, art, politics, social media and whatever else happens to be on his mind at the time.

Starting in 2001, Seconds and his wife Allyson owned and maintained True Love Coffeehouse in Sacramento but closed four years later after multiple problems with the landlord of the building. In 2006, Seconds reopened True Love in a new location, not far from the original location but closed it after two years, after having personal, economic, and philosophical differences with his silent business partners. The couple has no immediate plans to re-open the cafe.

In the summer of 2018, the Secondses opened an art gallery, shop and live music space called Riving Loom Arts in Sacramento. Various nationally-known singer-songwriters such as Vic Ruggiero, Dave Dondero, Kepi Ghoulie, Jonah Matranga and Micah Schnabel have performed there.

Solo career 
Starting as a solo artist in 1989, Kevin Seconds began performing as a solo acoustic performer, debuting as an opener to the band Dramarama at the City Gardens club in Trenton, New Jersey. Since then, he has toured the United States and Europe extensively under his own name and has played with the likes of Elliott Smith, Jonathan Richman, Ben Lee, John Doe, Bouncing Souls, Bad Brains, Bob Mould, Chuck Ragan (Hot Water Music), Ben Nichols (Lucero), Vic Ruggiero (The Slackers), Greg Attonito (Bouncing Souls), Joey Cape (Lagwagon) and Jesse Michaels (Operation Ivy), among other acts. He has released 7 solo albums (Stoudamire, Heaven's Near Wherever You Are, Rise Up Insomniacs, Good Luck Buttons, Don't Let Me Lose Ya, Off Stockton and New Years Rulin's, a tribute record featuring 33 short songs inspired by Woody Guthrie's 33 new year's resolutions for the year 1943, and has appeared on several compilations, split 7 inch vinyl releases (including releases with Mike Hale (Gunmoll) and Mike Scott (Phinius Gage and Lay It on the Line (band)) and a split album with Matt Skiba of Alkaline Trio, released in 2002 on Asian Man Records.

He frequently collaborates with his wife Allyson, who sings lead in her own musical project BagOKittens with Sacramento-based singer-songwriter Anton Barbeau.

After 38 years of touring and recording,  7 Seconds called it quits, citing personal health issues as the main reason.  Seconds has focused almost solely on his solo music and tours as frequently as possible. Since the summer of 2008, he has toured extensively throughout North America, as well as the U.K. and mainland Europe.

Straight edge 
As with Ian MacKaye of Minor Threat, Seconds has had a great deal of influence on the straight edge subculture but has never fully embraced it as a movement. He has been outspoken about his opposition to the more militant aspects of straight edge and does not support it. Seconds continues to maintain a drug/alcohol/smoke-free lifestyle but appears to have no interest in being a spokesman for the straight edge lifestyle. He is vegetarian.

Discography 
 1997 Stoudamire (Earth/Cargo)
 2001 Heaven's Near Wherever You Are (Headhunter)
 2002 Matt Skiba & Kevin Seconds (Split CD with Matt Skiba)
 2008 Rise Up, Insomniacs! (Asian Man)
 2010 Good Luck Buttons (Asian Man)
 2012 Don't Let Me Lose Ya (Asian Man)
 2014 Off Stockton (Rise)
 2014 New Years Rulin's (This Means Something)
 2016 Band-Aid On A Bullet Wound (Birthday Money)

References

External links 
Kevin Seconds Stageit (live webcast) Page
Sound Salvation Radio with Kevin Seconds
Interview with Kevin Seconds on PMAKid.com

1961 births
American punk rock musicians
Living people
Musicians from Reno, Nevada
Musicians from Sacramento, California
Songwriters from California
Writers from Reno, Nevada